Talk the Talk is the thirteenth studio album by Australian hard rock band, The Angels, released on 17 January 2014. It is the second album to have the Screaming Jets' lead singer, Dave Gleeson, on vocals. The album peaked at number 46 on the ARIA Albums Chart.

Track listing 
 "Talk the Talk" (John Brewster, Marcus Ahern, Rick Brewster) 4:59
 "Got an Itch" (Dave Gleeson, J. Brewster, R. Brewster) 3:22
 "Every Man" (J. Brewster, Nick Norton) 5:35
 "Broken Windows" (D. Gleeson, J. Brewster) 3:52
 "Heart of Stone" (D. Gleeson, R. Brewster) 3:42
 "Got a Feeling" (D. Gleeson, R. Brewster) 4:09
 "Nations Are Falling" (J. Brewster, N. Norton, R. Brewster) 4:18
 "You Might Make It" (Norton) 3:11
 "Book of Law" (N. Norton, Sam Brewster) 3:32
 "I Come in Peace" (R. Brewster, Ross Wilson) 4:12
 "Personal Thing" (R. Brewster) 4:39
 "No Rhyme nor Reason" (R. Brewster) 4:18

Personnel 
 Dave Gleeson – lead vocals
 Rick Brewster – lead guitar, vocals
 John Brewster – rhythm guitar, vocals
 Nick Norton – drums, vocals
 Sam Brewster – bass

Production
 Rick Brewster – producer

Charts

References 

2014 albums
The Angels (Australian band) albums